Nicolae Osmochescu (born November 12, 1944, Bozovici, Caraș-Severin) is a professor of international law at Moldova State University.

Biography 
Nicolae Osmochescu was born on November 12, 1944. He was educated at the Moldova State University in the Department of International Law and the Law of Foreign Economic Relations. He obtained a PhD in Law while serving as the First Deputy Foreign Minister of Moldova in the First and Second Ciubuc Cabinets. In the early 21st century, Osmochescu served as Moldova's Ambassador in Tashkent, Bishkek and Dushanbe. He is a former Judge of the Constitutional Court of Moldova.

References

External links
 Osmochescu Nicolae, doctor,  professor universitar 
 www.constcourt.md - official site 
 Foreign Minister of Moldova

Living people
Moldovan diplomats
Constitutional Court of Moldova judges
Government ministers of Moldova
Moldova State University alumni
Academic staff of Moldova State University
1944 births
People from Caraș-Severin County